is a Japanese anime television series produced by A-1 Pictures and Aniplex and directed by Mamoru Kanbe. The 12-episode anime aired in Japan on the TV Tokyo television network between January 4, 2010 and March 22, 2010. The anime was also simulcast on Crunchyroll. Sound of the Sky was the debut project of Anime no Chikara. A manga adaptation illustrated by Yagi Shinba began serialization in the January 2010 issue of ASCII Media Works' Dengeki Daioh magazine. A visual novel developed by Compile Heart was released on the PlayStation Portable in May 2010.

Plot
Sound of the Sky revolves around a young girl named Kanata Sorami who is inspired to join the military after witnessing a rendition of "Amazing Grace" by a mysterious trumpeter of the Helvetian Army. Becoming a bugler, she is assigned to the 1121st Platoon stationed in the town of Seize (inspired by Cuenca, Spain) in Helvetia (another name for Switzerland), where she is taken into the care of 2nd Lt. Filicia Heideman, M/Sgt. Rio Kazumiya and the rest of the 1121st Platoon. The story takes place in a post-apocalyptic world after a great war regressed humanity's technological capabilities back to early-to-mid 20th century standards.

Characters

Inspired by the song of a mysterious military trumpeter, 15-year-old Kanata joins the army as a bugler and is assigned to the 1121st Platoon. Despite being gifted with absolute pitch, Kanata initially lacks musical prowess, but gradually improves as the story progresses. She is portrayed as optimistic and cheerful, yet dedicated to her duties as a soldier and as a member of the platoon.

Rio is a 17-year-old Master Sergeant who is also a bugler and trumpeter, and the sole instructor of Kanata in learning military calls and signals. Rio is shown to have a no-nonsense attitude and is stricter in her discipline and the issuance of orders as compared to her commanding officer. Later in the story, she is revealed to be the half-sister of the late Princess Iliya, as well as the second heir to the Arkadia family. Due to her strained family history, she joined the 1121st as a means of escape, but later leaves in order to save the peace talks with the Roman Empire and prevent war. She is later promoted to Lieutenant upon rejoining the platoon after the war ends.

The 18-year-old platoon leader of the 1121st with the rank of Second Lieutenant, Filicia tends to stray away from military convention, preferring to exercise a more casual leadership. Filicia does away with addressing rank with members in the platoon so that everyone is known on a first name basis. Her kindness and gentle nature is well known by the girls as she acts as a type of mother figure to them. Prior to her commission of the 1121st, Filicia was previously assigned to an active combat tank platoon of which she was the only survivor. She is later promoted to Captain.

A private and the platoon's designated gunner, Kureha is the youngest of the girls in the 1121st at the age of 14. Kureha has a strong respect for military code and obeying orders. Her parents died when she was very young and she only knows of them through stories told by others. Her father was once a respected tank commander, and because of this, she took an immediate liking to Major Claus, having believed him to be the one and only "Desert Wolf".

The platoon's 15-year-old designated pilot and appointed mechanic with the rank of corporal, Noël is often portrayed as sleepy and tired, resulting in her falling asleep when in the company of others or in the middle of something. She spends most of the time repairing the platoon's battle tank, the Takemikazuchi, which is considered a technological relic from the previous age of prosperity. Initially, Noël is unsociable, but slowly breaks out of her mold due to Kanata's friendship. She was purportedly a genius in the Helvetian Academy, earning praise by military officials who used her to help them resurrect a bioweapon technology dubbed the Invisible Reaper. As a result of the terrible devastation and loss of life caused by such weapons, Noël was branded by the Romans with the moniker "Witch of Helvetia".

Yumina is a priestess at the local church who looks after orphaned children. She also acts as a nurse when people fall ill and is fluent in the language of the Roman Empire, which in the story is presented as modern-day German.

A commissioned officer holding the rank of Major, Claus is a despatch rider and close friend of the 1121st. He is mistakenly identified by Kureha as the "Desert Wolf" or "Miracle Claus", a tank commander of the same name and similar appearance who is renowned for his courage and service in the Helvetian army. Due to Kureha's admiration and awe for his supposed reputation, Claus finds it difficult to reveal the truth to her.

Naomi is the owner of a glassware shop who also acts as the front man for some of the 1121st Platoon's dubious activities, including an illegal alcohol distillery.

Mishio is an orphaned girl under Yumina's care. She is very protective of who braids her hair, since her mother used to do it for her.

Seiya is an orphaned boy under Yumina's care. He is hostile towards soldiers, whom he blames for his parents' deaths, although his view of the soldiers at the Clocktower Fortress improve with the passing of time.

The late first Princess of the Archduke of Arkadia and the half-sister of Rio, she died two years prior to the story. Iliya was the trumpeter of her squad and is known for her renditions of Amazing Grace, which at various times in the past had inspired members of the 1121st platoon.

Aisha is a Roman scout that Kanata and Kureha discover unconscious and injured while on patrol. While in their care, the platoon quickly befriends her despite the language barrier (as she only speaks in her native tongue) and her status as the enemy. Aisha is revealed to be connected to Noël in the past, having been a survivor of the onslaught caused by the Invisible Reaper.

Shuko is a northern white-faced owl that the girls find and decide to keep as embodiment of their mascot. He is thought to have been owned by Princess Iliya in the past.

A feared Colonel of the Helvetian army, also known as the Demon of Vingt. His desire is actually to provoke war from the Roman Empire. He plans to do this by kidnapping and executing Aisha, but she escapes and is found by the 1121st Platoon, who foil his plans and end the war.

Media

Manga
Before the anime's release, a manga adaptation illustrated by Yagi Shinba was serialized between the January 2010 and June 2011 issues of ASCII Media Works' Dengeki Daioh magazine. The story is written by Paradores who provided the original concept for Sound of the Sky. Two tankōbon volumes were released.

Anime
Sound of the Sky is the debut project of Anime no Chikara, a joint project of TV Tokyo's anime department and Aniplex aiming to assemble creators to develop original anime television series. The anime aired in Japan on TV Tokyo between January 5 and March 22, 2010, and it was also simulcast on Crunchyroll. The anime is produced by Aniplex, with animation produced handled by A-1 Pictures, and directed by Mamoru Kanbe. The screenplay is written by Hiroyuki Yoshino who based the story on Paradores' original concept. Character design is provided by Toshifumi Akai who based the designs on Mel Kishida's original concept. Music direction is led by Michiru Ōshima. The first BD/DVD compilation volume containing the first two episodes was released in Japan on March 24, 2010, distributed by Aniplex. Two original video animation episodes were released on the fourth and seventh BD/DVD volumes that were released in Japan on June 23 and September 22, 2010, respectively. At Anime Expo 2010, anime distributor Nozomi Entertainment had announced that they have licensed the series. They released the series in a series box set on July 5, 2011. At AmeCon 2010, European anime distributor Beez Entertainment announced that they have the distribution rights to the series.

Two pieces of theme music are used for the series: one opening theme and one ending theme. The ending theme is "Girls, Be Ambitious." by Haruka Tomatsu and the single was released on January 27, 2010 by Music Ray'n. The anime's original soundtrack was released on March 24, 2010 by Aniplex.

Episodes

Visual novel
A musical visual novel based on the anime titled  developed by Compile Heart for the PlayStation Portable was released in limited and regular editions on May 27, 2010. It introduces an original character,  (voiced by Marina Inoue).

References

External links
Official website 
Sound of the Sky  at TV Tokyo 
Visual novel official website 

2010 anime OVAs
2010 anime television series debuts
2010 manga
2010 video games
A-1 Pictures
Aniplex franchises
Anime with original screenplays
ASCII Media Works manga
Dengeki Daioh
Japan-exclusive video games
Music video games
PlayStation Portable games
PlayStation Portable-only games
Post-apocalyptic fiction
Post-apocalyptic video games
Slice of life anime and manga
Science fiction anime and manga
Shōnen manga
Video games developed in Japan
TV Tokyo original programming
Visual novels